James Smailes (9 June 1907 – 1986) was an English professional footballer who played for Tow Law Town, Huddersfield Town, Tottenham Hotspur, Blackpool, Grimsby Town, Stockport County, Bradford City and Waterhouses Sports Club.

Football career 
Smailes began his career at his local non-League club Tow Law Town before joining Huddersfield Town in 1927. 

He featured in 32 matches and found the net on eight occasions for the Yorkshire club. 

The outside left signed for Tottenham Hotspur in 1930. He scored on his 'Lilywhites' debut in a 3-1 victory over Bradford City at White Hart Lane in March 1931 in the old Second Division. Smailes made 16 appearances and scored three goals for 'Spurs'. 

After leaving London Smailes played at Blackpool where he scored 25 goals in 92 matches. 

He went on to play for Grimsby Town, Stockport County, Bradford City before finally ending his playing career at Waterhouses Sports Club.

During World War II, Smailes was a guest player at Bradford Park Avenue, Hartlepool United and Huddersfield Town. 

He died in 1986.

References
Specific

General

1907 births
1986 deaths
English footballers
People from Tow Law
Footballers from County Durham
Association football midfielders
English Football League players
Huddersfield Town A.F.C. players
Tottenham Hotspur F.C. players
Blackpool F.C. players
Grimsby Town F.C. players
Stockport County F.C. players
Bradford City A.F.C. players
Tow Law Town F.C. players